HD 216446 is a binary star system in the northern circumpolar constellation of Cepheus. It is faintly visible to the naked eye with a combined apparent visual magnitude of 4.77. The system is located at a distance of approximately 319 light years from the Sun based on parallax, but is drifting closer with a radial velocity of −32 km/s. It is predicted to come to within  in around 1.876 million years. The system has an absolute magnitude of −0.14.

The magnitude 4.92 primary, designated component A, is an aging giant star with a stellar classification of K3III. The luminosity class of III typically indicates that the star has exhausted the supply of hydrogen at its core, then cooled and expanded off the main sequence. At present it has 25 times the radius of the Sun. The star has a lower abundance of elements other than hydrogen and helium compared to the Sun; what astronomers term the star's metallicity. It is radiating 193 times the luminosity of the Sun from its enlarged photosphere at an effective temperature of 4288 K.

References

K-type giants
Binary stars
Cepheus (constellation)
Durchmusterung objects
216446
112519
8702